Infantella is a genus of demosponges in the family Coelospharidae.  The species in this genus differ from those in other genera through having a single kind of diactinal megascleres (single axis spicules with similar ends) and no mircoscleres. This genus contains 6 species.

Species 
The following species are recognised:

 Inflatella belli (Kirkpatrick, 1907), Gooseberry sponge
 Inflatella coelosphaeroides (Koltun, 1964)
 Inflatella globosa (Koltun, 1955)
 Inflatella pellicula (Schmidt, 1875)
 Inflatella tubulosa (Topsent, 1904)
 Inflatella viridis (Topsent, 1890)

References

External links

Demospongiae
Sponge genera